Xeropsamobeus is a genus of aphodiine dung beetles in the family Scarabaeidae. There are about 10 described species in Xeropsamobeus.

Species
These 10 species belong to the genus Xeropsamobeus:
 Xeropsamobeus acerbus (Horn, 1887)
 Xeropsamobeus ambiguus (Fall, 1907)
 Xeropsamobeus arenicolus Gordon and Skelley, 2007
 Xeropsamobeus asellus (Schmidt, 1907)
 Xeropsamobeus brighti Gordon and Skelley, 2007
 Xeropsamobeus desertus (Van Dyke, 1918)
 Xeropsamobeus doyeni Gordon and Skelley, 2007
 Xeropsamobeus mohavei Gordon and Skelley, 2007
 Xeropsamobeus padrei Gordon and Skelley, 2007
 Xeropsamobeus scabriceps (LeConte, 1878)

References

Scarabaeidae